Dario Oliviero (born 12 July 1972), better known by his stage name Gabriel Garko, is an Italian actor and former fashion model.
Actor in both film and television, he has appeared mainly on the small screen. He started his career at the end of 1990s but achieved a breakthrough in 2006 with the television drama L'onore e il rispetto where he plays the mob boss Tonio Fortebracci.

Background
Born in Turin, Piedmont, Italy to a Venetian father and Sicilian mother, Garko was raised in the nearby suburb of Settimo Torinese. His film credits include Callas Forever (2002), and L'onore e il rispetto (2006), a television mini-series where he portrayed a ruthless fictitious Mafia boss Tonio Fortebracci. In Tinto Brass' Senso '45, he appears full-frontal nude in a scene with lead actress Anna Galiena. He starred alongside actresses Serena Autieri and Manuela Arcuri. In 2010, he starred in the main role of Nito Valdi in another mini-series Il peccato e la vergogna, which was set in Italy during World War II. Manuela Arcuri was his co-star in this series as well. In 2011, he starred in the television mini-series , a police thriller.

He currently lives in Zagarolo. Garko is the owner of a riding school; enjoys bodybuilding, swimming, horse riding and skiing. He came out as bisexual in September 2020.

Filmography

References

External links

 

1974 births
Living people
Actors from Turin
Italian male models
Italian male film actors
Italian male television actors
Male beauty pageant winners
Italian beauty pageant winners
Bisexual male actors
LGBT models
Italian bisexual people
Italian LGBT actors
Models from Turin